Jabra may refer to:

Jabra (brand), electronics company in Denmark
Jabra Ibrahim Jabra (1919–1994), Palestinian author
Jabra Nicola (1912–1974), Arab Israeli and Palestinian Trotskyist leader